Eric Patrick Moore (born January 28, 1965) is a former American football guard who played for the New York Giants (1988–1993), the Cincinnati Bengals (1994), the Cleveland Browns (1995) and the Miami Dolphins (1995).  Moore was drafted in the first round (tenth overall) of the 1988 NFL Draft.  He was a starter for the Giants in their Super Bowl XXV triumph.

In 1993, Moore was sentenced to a six-month pretrial diversion program for steroid possession along with former New York Giants teammate Mark Duckens. They were described by federal agents as "pawns in international steroid ring." Moore was also suspended for the first four weeks of the 1993 NFL season.

Moore lived in the Wolf Creek subdivision in Macon, Georgia for a while and his nickname in college was "PK".

References

1965 births
Living people
People from St. Louis County, Missouri
American football offensive linemen
Indiana Hoosiers football players
New York Giants players
Cincinnati Bengals players
Cleveland Browns players
Miami Dolphins players